Ernst Schatz (1844–1887) was a German entomologist who specialised in Lepidoptera.

He wrote with Otto Staudinger (1830-1900), Exotische Schmetterlinge in 1888. His collection of exotic butterflies and moths is held by the Museum für Naturkunde in Berlin.

German lepidopterists
1844 births
1887 deaths
Date of birth missing